All or ALL may refer to:

Language
 All, an indefinite pronoun in English
 All, one of the English determiners
 Allar language (ISO 639-3 code)
 Allative case (abbreviated ALL)

Music
 All (band), an American punk rock band
 All (All album), 1999
 All (Descendents album) or the title song, 1987
 All (Horace Silver album) or the title song, 1972
 All (Yann Tiersen album), 2019
 "All" (song), by Patricia Bredin, representing the UK at Eurovision 1957
 "All (I Ever Want)", a song by Alexander Klaws, 2005
 "All", a song by Collective Soul from Hints Allegations and Things Left Unsaid, 1994

Science and mathematics
 ALL (complexity), the class of all decision problems in computability and complexity theory
 Acute lymphoblastic leukemia
 Anterolateral ligament

Sports
 All (tennis)
 American Lacrosse League
 Arena Lacrosse League, Canada
 Australian Lacrosse League

Other uses
 All, Missouri, a community in the United States
 All, a brand of Sun Products
 Albanian lek by ISO 4217 currency code
 All., taxonomic author abbreviation for Carlo Allioni (1728–1804), Italian physician and professor of botany

See also

 Awl (disambiguation)
 Alle (disambiguation)
 Allyl group
 "For all", a universal quantification in predicate logic, represented by ∀